The 1938–39 season was the 30th in the history of the Isthmian League, an English football competition.

Leytonstone were champions for the second time in a row, winning their third Isthmian League title. At the end of the season Casuals merged with Corinthian to form a new club Corinthian-Casuals.

League table

References

Isthmian League seasons
I